Greenwich is an unincorporated community in Limestone Township, Kankakee County, Illinois, United States.

References

Unincorporated communities in Kankakee County, Illinois
Unincorporated communities in Illinois